That Awkward Moment (released as Are We Officially Dating? in Australia, Indonesia, and New Zealand) is a 2014 American bromantic comedy drama film written and directed by Tom Gormican in his directorial debut. The film stars Zac Efron, Miles Teller, Michael B. Jordan, Imogen Poots, Mackenzie Davis, and Jessica Lucas. The film had its Los Angeles premiere on January 27, 2014, and it was widely released on January 31 in the United States.

Plot
Jason is sitting on a bench in New York City waiting for someone to arrive. A voiceover explains that he has been waiting for a long time, but to explain why, he needs to go back to the beginning. Jason begins by telling the audience that every relationship reaches the "So..." moment, where someone in the relationship will want to take the relationship to a more serious place. At that point, Jason knows the relationship is over, as he is not ready to stop dating.

Jason is currently working with his best friend Daniel at a publishing house designing book covers. Their friend Mikey, a young doctor who has been married to Vera since the end of college, comes to them after Vera requests a divorce. The three decide to go out to a bar and celebrate being single. The group meets up with Daniel's female wingman, Chelsea, as they try to get Mikey's mind off of his wife. Mikey meets a girl with glasses, while Jason meets Ellie, and hits it off with her after teasing another man that was trying to buy her a drink. Mikey gets "Glasses" number, but puts off calling her, resolving to work it out with Vera. Jason sleeps with Ellie, but leaves her apartment in a hurry after jumping to the mistaken conclusion that she is a prostitute.

The next day, Jason and Daniel make a book cover pitch to a new author, who happens to be Ellie. Jason is able to explain himself and the two begin seeing each other on a regular basis. Meanwhile, Daniel begins to fall for Chelsea, and the two begin seeing one another. Additionally, Mikey meets with Vera, and when she claims that the reason their marriage fell apart is because he is not spontaneous enough, Mikey kisses her, and the two sleep together in the hospital, reigniting their romance. All three friends attempt to keep their relationships a secret, due to their earlier agreement that they would stay single. The relationships all come to a head during Thanksgiving, a time that the three friends usually spend together, but varying circumstances keep them apart. Jason agrees to attend a funeral for Ellie's recently passed father, Mikey plans a Thanksgiving dinner with Vera, and Daniel attends the traditional Thanksgiving feast with Chelsea, free to openly tell the guests about their relationship.

Jason ultimately decides not to attend the funeral, not ready to fully commit to Ellie, and their relationship falls apart. Mikey has a serious conversation with Vera during their dinner, causing her to admit that she no longer loves him. Jason and Mikey head to the dinner where they discover Daniel's relationship with Chelsea, and when he denies that they are dating, his relationship falls apart as well. Although the three fight about having kept their relationships secret, they repair their friendship and try to recover their relationships.

Mikey calls "Glasses", setting up a date, and Daniel reunites with Chelsea after being hit by a taxi and ending up in the hospital. However, Jason has still not reconciled with Ellie, despite still being in love with her. Two months later, Mikey and Daniel help Jason by encouraging him to tell her of his love at her weekly book readings, which are usually sparsely attended. However, upon their arrival, the reading is full and Jason is unable to figure out a way to talk with her. He decides to make a scene by improvising a book reading, referencing their first meeting and requesting that they start over by meeting in Gramercy Park.

Returning to the beginning, Jason is waiting for Ellie in Gramercy Park. Four hours later, Ellie joins him on the bench, and Jason begins with "So..."

Cast

Production
That Awkward Moment was developed by What If It Barks Films and was originally titled Are We Officially Dating?, the title it was released under in New Zealand, Indonesia, and Australia. The script was featured as one of the top comedy screenplays in the 2010 Hollywood Black List of best un-produced screenplays. In September 2013, the film's title changed to That Awkward Moment.

Zac Efron was the first cast member to be announced in August 2012, alongside an announcement that production would begin in New York City in November 2012. Miles Teller was reported to have joined the cast in October 2012, with Imogen Poots and Michael B. Jordan following in November 2012.

Release
In June 2013, the U.S. distribution rights for That Awkward Moment were acquired by FilmDistrict with a wide release set for January 31, 2014. Because of a transition of FilmDistrict properties to Focus Features, That Awkward Moment was later absorbed by the reconstituted Focus Features for its January 2014 release.

The first red band trailer was released on October 14, 2013.

Critical response 
That Awkward Moment received mostly negative reviews from critics. Rotten Tomatoes gives the film an approval rating of 22% based on reviews from 142 critics, with an average rating of 4.10 out of 10. The site's consensus is: "Formulaic and unfunny, That Awkward Moment wastes a charming cast on a contrived comedy that falls short of the date movies it seems to be trying to subvert." On Metacritic, the film has a weighted average score of 36 out of 100, based on reviews from 33 critics, indicating "generally unfavorable reviews".

Scott Foundas of Variety wrote: "The pic falls well short of its efforts to combine the raucous vulgarity of the "Hangover" movies with Cameron Crowe-ish depth of feeling." Peter Travers of Rolling Stone complained that the film was full of clichés but that "The compensation comes in the three lead actors, all way too good for the material dished out by writer-director Tom Gormican." Stephen Holden of The New York Times called it "A vile, witless sex comedy."

Accolades
Zac Efron won  an award for this performance at the 2014 MTV Movie Awards for Best Shirtless Performance.

References

External links
 
 
 

2014 films
2014 romantic comedy films
American buddy comedy films
American romantic comedy films
2010s English-language films
2010s buddy comedy films
2010s sex comedy films
Films set in New York City
Films shot in New York City
2014 directorial debut films
2010s American films